South Cumminsville is a neighborhood in Cincinnati, Ohio. It is bordered by Northside, Camp Washington, Millvale, and Fay Apartments. The population was 702 at the 2020 census.

Demographics

Source - City of Cincinnati Statistical Database.

Numbers before 2010 include both Millvale and South Cumminsville

2010 w/ Millvale  - 3200

2020 w/ Millvale  - 2667

Notable people 

 Dave Parker - professional baseball player

History
For years, South Cumminsville was the southern portion of a larger settlement known as Cumminsville. Cumminsville was incorporated in 1865 and annexed into Cincinnati eight years later. In the early 1900s, growth attracted many German Catholics. Cumminsville also attracted a number of African-Americans, who moved to the area of Follett and Dreman avenues. This sub-neighborhood became known as South Cumminsville, according to history books. Boosted by the opening of the Millvale apartments in the 1950s, South Cumminsville evolved into a predominantly African-American community. Many of the newcomers in the northern portions of Cumminsville became to identify themselves with Northside, while South Cumminsville retained its identity.

One of the more grisly aspects of Cumminsville history stems from a rash of unsolved murders that occurred there in the early 1900s.  From 1904-1910, five women were savagely slain within a mile of the Spring Grove and Winton Road corner in Cumminsville, earning the district the grisly sobriquet of "the murder zone" and sparking fear that Cincinnati was in the grip of its first serial killer.  These five cases remain unsolved, and are detailed in the first chapter of the book "Queen City Gothic", by local author and true crime historian JT. Townsend.

Community organizations and projects
South Cumminsville is a strong, active community. South Cumminsville United For Better Housing (SCUFBH) continues to look forward to future projects to continue building homeownership in the neighborhood. The South Cumminsville Community Council (SCCC) continues to work to improve the neighborhood. It has a newsletter that goes to each member of the community four times a year and it has been focusing its efforts on community beautification. Twice a year SCCC hosts a neighborhood clean-up day and has been working on teaching the youth about recycling. In 2004, SCCC painted a mural at the neighborhood gateway at Beekman Street and put up banners on the major neighborhood streets. Both of these projects were designed through collaboration between the neighborhood youth and seniors to illustrate the history and beauty of the community. SCCC hopes to continue this theme of neighborhood beautification and community teamwork in future gateway projects.

References

Neighborhoods in Cincinnati
Former municipalities in Ohio